Pushcha-Vodytsia (also Pushcha-Voditsa,) is a historic neighbourhood, climate resort and an urban-type settlement (1981-2001) in the northwestern part of Kyiv (Obolon Raion). Located within a dense forest and away from the urban Kyiv, it is known for number of sanatoriums and state cottages for government officials such as presidents, prime-ministers etc.

The southern border of the neighborhood is considered Hostomelske shose (Hostomel Highway), the eastern – Minsky prospekt (Minsk Parkway), the western – the road to the village of Moshchun, Bucha Raion (Kyiv Oblast). The area stretches north to the village of Demydiv, Vyshhorod Raion (Kyiv Oblast). The name was combined from two Slavic words, pushcha (пуща), which stands for a dense forest, and Vodytsia (Водиця), the name of a nearby river (not existing).

In 1724 by the orders of Peter I here was established a forestry. Until the end of the 18th century the area was contested between the Mezhyhirya Monastery and Brotherhood Monastery. In 1793 the argument was decided by the Senate transferring the neighborhood into the possession of the Kyiv city as a cottage settlement Pushcha-Vodytsia, which soon turned into a small khutor.

In 1899, a dacha- or cottage-type settlement was founded in the Pushcha-Vodytsia forests. Later on, Soviet sanatoriums were located in the settlement, as well as in other settlements nearby. In 1981, the village acquired the status of an urban-type settlement, subordinate to the Podilskyi Raion (district) of Kyiv, later in 2002 the area was passed to the Obolon Raion, and settlement lost its separate administration.

A 1910 church designed by Eduard Bradtman still stands in the city.

References

Neighborhoods in Kyiv
Merged settlements in Ukraine
Obolonskyi District